Rita Winkler (born 1987) is a Canadian artist who is known for her paintings and artbook, My Art, My World.

Biography 
Rita Winkler was born in 1987 with Down syndrome in Calgary, Alberta. She attended Drewry Secondary School where she learnt sign language. Later, she went to DANI, an organization which is helping people with disabilities, where she participated in their stage productions and wrote their newsletters. At DANI, she discovered her passion for art.

After the death of her father due to cancer in 2002, her family moved to Toronto, Ontario in 2003. There, Rita began a life that included folk dancing, yoga, signing, and painting. As a folk dancer, she used to perform dance until COVID-19 pandemic at Prosserman Jewish Community Centre with her mother, Helen, who also taught a course called Move N'Mingle at the center. Nowadays, she performs a dance with her mother for Jake's Jam every Sunday.

In the past few years, Rita flourished as an artist, painting how she sees life through her own eyes. Alongside creating paintings, she also likes to paint birthday cakes and create birthday cards.

During the pandemic, she took classes at L'Arche London and learnt watercolor painting.

In 2021, a publishing company approached her family, and with the help of her mother, Helen Winkler, and her uncle, Mark Winkler, from New York, they co-authored an educational picture book entitled, My Art, My World. The book shows how she views her life through paintings and teaches inclusion. The book received positive reviews, including a star in Kirkus Reviews.

Rita is also a member of the Ontario Folk Dance Association.

Bibliography 
 Winkler, Rita; Winkler, Helen; Winkler, Mark (2021). My Art, My World

References

External links 
 Rita Winkler - Official website

Living people
1987 births
People with Down syndrome
21st-century Canadian women artists